There are few castles in Shetland, the northernmost of the Northern Isles which lie off the coast of Scotland. Shetland is well known for its prehistoric heritage including several well-preserved brochs and iron-age promontory forts, and the islands were later a centre of Viking culture. In the Middle Ages when stone castles became more common in Scotland and elsewhere, few were built in Shetland: the Royal Commission on the Ancient and Historical Monuments of Scotland record only one such site, the ruins on Castle Holm on an islet within Loch of Strom. The two surviving castles were both built around the same time, by the Stewart and Bruce families who were initially allies but later feuded with one another. The much later Vaila Tower is a 19th-century folly, elaborated by the laird of Vaila from an existing watch tower.

List

See also
Castles in Scotland
List of castles in Scotland
List of listed buildings in Shetland

Notes

 
Shetland